Nagpur railway division may refer to:

 Nagpur CR railway division
 Nagpur SEC railway division

Disambiguation pages